The Kela-2 gas field is a natural gas field located in Xinjiang. It was discovered in 1998 and developed by and China National Petroleum Corporation. It began production in 2004 and produces natural gas and condensates. The total proven reserves of the Kela-2 gas field are around 10 trillion cubic feet (284 km³), and production is slated to be around 248 million cubic feet/day (7×105m³) in 2010.

References

Natural gas fields in China